Eurytides leucaspis is a species of butterfly found in the Neotropical realm.

Taxonomy
There are two subspecies recognised:
E. l. leucaspis - northern Colombia, eastern Ecuador, northern Peru, Bolivia
E. l. lamidis Brown & Lamas, 1994 - western Venezuela (Tachira), Colombia

Description
Eurytides leucaspis can reach a wingspan of almost . These large butterflies have a frons entirely brownish black. The abdomen is yellowish beneath. The wings have a common triangular green-yellow area, and a brown marginal area with blackish hues parallel to the margin.

lamis R.& J. The posterior cell-spots of the forewing is large, very distinct also beneath.

leucaspis Godt. The cell-spots of the forewing is smaller, usually only indicated beneath, the two outer posterior cell-spots arte more widely separated from one another.

Distribution
This species is present in Colombia, eastern Ecuador, northern Peru, Bolivia and western Venezuela.

Status
Common and not threatened.

References

Further reading
D'Abrera, B. (1981). Butterflies of the Neotropical Region. Part I. Papilionidae and Pieridae. Lansdowne Editions, Melbourne, xvi + 172 pp.
D'Almeida, R.F. (1965). Catalogo dos Papilionidae Americanos. Sociedade Brasileira de Entomologia. São Paulo, Brasil.
Rothschild, W. and Jordan, K. (1906). A revision of the American Papilios. Novitates Zoologicae 13: 411-752. online (and as pdf) (Facsimile edition ed. P.H. Arnaud, 1967).
Tyler, H. A.; Brown Jr., K. S.; Wilson, K. H. (1994) Swallowtail Butterflies of the Americas. A Study in Biological Dynamics, Ecological Diversity, Biosystematics, and Conservation., Tyler, H. A.; Brown Jr., K. S.; Wilson, K. H. (1994) Swallowtail Butterflies of the Americas. A Study in Biological Dynamics, Ecological Diversity, Biosystematics, and Conservation. , Scientific Publishers, Gainesville, Florida.

External links

Butterflies of the Americas images

Eurytides
Butterflies described in 1819